Kharg (also Romanized as Khārk) is a city in Kharg District of Bushehr County, Bushehr Province, Iran. At the 2006 census, its population was 8,196 in 1,963 households. The following census in 2011 counted 7,722 people in 2,115 households. At the latest census in 2016, the district had 8,193 inhabitants living in 2,374 households. Kharg is located on Kharg Island in the Persian Gulf.

Climate 
Kharg has a hot semi-arid climate (Köppen climate classification: BSh).

References

Populated places in Bushehr County
Cities in Bushehr Province